Havzi Nela (20 February 1934 – 10 August 1988) was an Albanian dissident poet, born in the village of Kollovoz in the district of Kukës. He managed to finish both elementary and high school while living in extreme poverty. In high school he began to express objections against what he perceived as "injustices" that, according to him, were created by the communist regime. After this he began studies at the Higher Pedagogical Institute of Shkodra (Luigj Gurakuqi University today), but was expelled due to seemingly rebellious and controversial beliefs. After much difficulty, he found a job as an elementary school teacher at Plani i Bardhe, a small village in the district of Mat, but was forced to leave the village due to suspicious activity. Suspicion arose after students began reading his poetry. He then went on to study at the Higher Pedagogical Institute of Shkodra by correspondence. He worked as a teacher in different villages such as Kruma, Lojme and Shishtavec until 1967, when he moved to Topojan. Topojan was where the most dramatic events of the poet and his family began.

Havzi Nela was constantly under surveillance and was often taken into custody. He was restricted and censored heavily in what he wrote, but also where and how he could live. After his students read the poem "Shko dallandyshe" (Go Swallow) written by Filip Shiroka, Havzi Nela and his wife, Lavdie, were under threat of prosecution from the government due to its controversial content. They risked their lives by taking the journey over the border into Kosovo, Yugoslavia on 26 April 1967. While crossing the frontier he wrote on a piece of paper; "Goodbye, homeland, I am leaving, but with a broken heart", (Lamtumire atdhe i dashur, se po iki zemërplasur). He placed the piece of paper in the branch of a hazel tree. It is widely believed that the purpose of this was to declare an undying love for the country and its people however expressing disdain towards its dictatorship.
A tragic fate would soon follow in Kosovo. He was captured just beyond the border together with his wife. They were arrested and imprisoned in Prizren, Kosovo.
On 6 May 1967, the Yugoslavian government agreed on an exchange turning Havzi Nela and Lavdie Nela in for several Yugoslavian prisoners held in Albania. The exchange took place at the Morina border crossing point.

On 22 May 1967, the poet was tried and sentenced by the courts of Kukës county to fifteen years in prison, on charges of betrayal and desertion of his country, serious offences under the regime of communist leader Enver Hoxha. His wife Lavdie Nela was sentenced to ten years in prison. She was offered the possibility of a shorter sentence if she would forsake and divorce her husband, but did not agree to this and accepted her punishment. Havzi Nela was imprisoned in the prison of Burrel initially then transferred to Spaç-Rrëshen prison.

On 8 August 1975, eight years were added to Nela's sentence due to his involvement in organising and leading an uprising which took place within the prison, directed against the government regime and the appalling conditions at the prison. On 19 December 1986, he was finally released from prison, but was strictly confined to the village of Arren. When news came of his dying mother less than a year later, on 12 October 1987 he left Arren to go and see her one last time. This was discovered by the government immediately and Havzi Nela was once again arrested and soon after sentenced to death by hanging.

On 24 June 1988, the Supreme Court of Albania's communist judges consisting of Fehmi Abdiu, Vili and Fatmira Laskaj Robo rejected Lavdie Nela's appeal against her husband's death sentence. Those behind this felt it was a good opportunity to make an example out of Havzi Nela. They built a contraption in the middle of the town of Kukës where he would be hanged publicly. The death penalty was signed by Ramiz Alia and Kristaq Rama, the father of Albania's current Prime Minister, Edi Rama On August 10, 1988, at 02:00 am, he was executed.
After being exposed all day on 10 August 1988, at midnight communist officials took his body and threw it vertically in a hole created by removal of a wooden pole at an undisclosed location. He was deprived of the opportunity to reach out to all the dead and to be laid to rest. His body remained buried at an undisclosed location for five years and ten days, until 20 August 1993. After numerous attempts by the post-communist government of Albania, this was the day that it finally became possible to search the land which was covered with rocks and bushes near Kolsh village, two kilometres away from Kukës. With the presidential decree of the President of the Republic of Albania, Sali Berisha, Havzi Nela was given the title "Martyr of Democracy".
In 2009, in marking the 75th anniversary of the birth of Havzi Nela, prominent writer Ismail Kadare wrote: "The poet Havzi Nela is a bell that still rings for Albanian society. Not to listen to it is to continue to be trampled on by the foot of the oppressor."

References

1934 births
1988 deaths
People from Kukës
Albanian male poets
People executed by Albania by hanging
Executed Albanian people
20th-century Albanian poets
20th-century male writers